The first-generation Acela Express trainset is a unique set of vehicles used on the Acela, Amtrak's flagship high-speed service along the Northeast Corridor (NEC) in the Northeastern United States. They were built between 1998 and 2001 by a consortium of Alstom and Bombardier. Each set has two power cars derived from units that Alstom built for the TGV, and six passenger cars derived from the LRC that Bombardier built for Via Rail.

While the Acela sets were based on TGV equipment, the power cars and passenger cars are much heavier in order to meet the Federal Railroad Administration's crash standards. Unlike the TGV, the Acela sets employ active tilting technology, which helps control lateral centrifugal force, allowing the train to travel at higher speeds on the sharply curved NEC without disturbing passengers.

Bombardier later used the Acela carriage design and a diesel/gas turbine variant of the power car for its experimental JetTrain.

The present Acela Express equipment will be replaced by new Avelia Liberty sets, beginning in fall 2023. The new trains will have greater passenger capacity and an enhanced active tilt system that will allow faster speed on the many curved sections of the route.

History

Building and development 

In the early 1990s, Amtrak tested several different high-speed trains from Europe to explore the possibility of adding a high-speed rail service along the Northeast Corridor. An X 2000 train was leased from Sweden for test runs from October 1992 to January 1993, followed by revenue service between Washington DC and New York City from February to May and August to September 1993. Siemens showed the ICE 1 train from Germany, organizing the ICE Train North America Tour which started to operate on the Northeast Corridor on July 3, 1993.

This testing allowed Amtrak to define a set of specifications that went into a public tender in October 1994. Requirements for the trainset included the ability to reach  and withstand a collision with a freight train at speed without collapsing.

Most manufacturers which bid on the Acela were unable to meet the structural requirements, due to increased costs and complications for the manufacture of the trains, and the need for manufacturers to make significant engineering changes to their standard designs. In the end, only three qualified bidders remained: ABB (manufacturer of the X 2000 train), Siemens (manufacturer of the ICE), and a consortium of Bombardier (manufacturer of the LRC trains) and GEC Alsthom (manufacturer of the French TGV).

The consortium of Bombardier (75%) and GEC Alsthom (now Alstom) (25%) was selected in March 1996.

A pilot trainset was completed by early 2000, and sent to Transportation Technology Center for testing in June 2000. An inaugural VIP run of the Acela occurred on November 16, 2000, with the VIP train being led by power car number 2020 with no. 2009 at the opposite end, followed by the first revenue run on December 11, 2000, a few months after the intended date.

Amtrak's original contract was for the delivery of 20 sets (6 coaches each, with power cars at front and rear) for $800 million. By 2004, Amtrak had settled contract disputes with the consortium, paying a total of $1.2 billion for the 20 sets, plus 15 extra electric locomotives, and the construction of maintenance facilities in Boston, New York, and Washington.

Outages 
In August 2002, shortly after their introduction, Acela sets were briefly removed from service when the brackets that connected truck (bogie) dampers (shocks) to the powerunit carbodies ("yaw dampers") were found to be cracking. The Acela returned to service when a program of frequent inspections was instituted. The damper brackets have since been redesigned and old brackets replaced by the newer design.

On April 15, 2005, the Acela was removed from service when cracks were found in the disc brakes of many passenger coaches. The Bombardier-Alstom consortium replaced the discs under warranty. Limited service resumed in July 2005, as a portion of the fleet operated with new brake discs. Metroliner trains, which the Acela Express was intended to replace, filled in during the outage. Amtrak announced on September 21, 2005, that all 20 trainsets had been returned to full operation.

Refurbishments 
The Acela trainsets underwent minor refurbishments between mid-2009 and 2010 at Penn Coach Yard, next to 30th Street Station in Philadelphia, Pennsylvania. These refurbishments included new blue leather seats throughout the trainset.

By 2011, the Acela fleet had reached half of its designed service life. Amtrak proposed several replacement options, including one as part of its A Vision for High-Speed Rail in the Northeast Corridor. In 2011, Amtrak announced that forty new Acela coaches would be ordered in 2012 to increase capacity on existing trainsets. The existing trains would have received two more coaches, lengthening the trainsets from a 1-6-1 configuration to 1-8-1 (power car — passenger cars — power car). The longer trainsets would have required the modifications of the Acela maintenance facilities in Boston, New York and Washington. The first of the stretched trainsets was to have entered service in fiscal year 2014. This plan was cancelled in 2012 in favor of replacing, rather than refurbishing, the Acela fleet.

In May 2018, Amtrak announced a 14-month program to refresh the interiors of the Acela sets, including new seat cushions and covers, new aisle carpeting, and a deep clean. This refurbishment program has been completed as of June 2019.

Replacement 
In January 2014, Amtrak issued a request for proposals on 28 or more new model Acela sets, in a combined order with the California High-Speed Rail Authority. These bids were due May 17, 2014. After discussions with manufacturers, Amtrak and the California High Speed Rail Authority concluded their needs were too disparate for common rolling stock and decided not to pursue the joint option. The present Acela Express equipment will be replaced by new Avelia Liberty sets, beginning in fall 2023. The new trains will have greater passenger capacity and an enhanced active tilt system that will allow faster speed on the many curved sections of the route.

Engineering

Design 
The sets use identical  power cars at each end which operate on a voltage of 11,000 volts AC, and either 25 or 60 Hz frequency, derives several components from the TGV, such as the third-generation TGV's traction system (including the four asynchronous AC motors per power car, rectifiers, inverters, and regenerative braking), the trucks/bogies structure (a long wheelbase dual transom H frame welded steel with outboard mounted tapered roller bearings), the brake discs (although there are only three per axle, versus four on the TGV), and crash energy management techniques to control structural deformation in the event of an accident.

The tilting carriages are based upon Bombardier's earlier LRC trains used on Via Rail rather than the TGV's non-tilting articulated trailers. Acela power cars and passenger cars are much heavier than those of the TGV in order to meet the FRA's crash standards. French and Canadian crews testing the Acela referred to it as "the pig" due to its weight. The Tier II crash standards, adopted in 1999, have also resulted in the passenger cars being designed without steps and trapdoors, which means that the sets can only serve lines with high-level platforms such as the Northeast Corridor. Acela trains are semi-permanently coupled (but not articulated as in the TGV) and are referred to as sets.

Operating speeds 
The average speed over the entire route is a slightly faster .

In practice, the Acela's speed depends more on local restrictions along its corridor than on its set. In addition to speed restrictions through urban areas, the Acela's corridor includes several speed restrictions below  over older bridges, or through tunnels a century old or more. Altogether, Amtrak has identified 224 bridges along Acela's route that are beyond their design life.

One limiting factor is the overhead catenary support system which was constructed before 1935 and lacks the constant-tension features of the new catenary east of New Haven. Certification testing for commercial operation at  involving test runs at up to  began between Trenton and New Brunswick in September 2012.

The improvements were scheduled to be completed in 2016, but have been delayed; the project is now scheduled to be finished in 2020.

Composition 
The production sets are formed as follows:

The Acela Express trainset consists of two power cars, a café car, a First Class car, and four Business Class cars, semi-permanently coupled together. Acela offers two classes of seating, Business Class and First Class. Unlike most other Amtrak trains, Business Class is the de facto standard class on Acela trains; there is no coach service.

The First Class car has 44 seats, being three seats across (one on one side, two on the other side), four seat tables and assigned seating. There are 260 Business Class seats on each set; these cars have four seats across (two on each side) and four-seat tables. Baggage may be stowed in overhead compartments or underneath seats. Trains are wheelchair-accessible. Each car has or two toilets, with one being ADA compliant. Automatic sliding doors between cars reduce noise.

Acela maintenance is generally taken care of at the Ivy City facility in Washington, DC; Sunnyside Yard in Queens, New York; or Southampton Street Yard in Boston.

References

External links 

Acela Express Trainset Information – On Track On Line

Amtrak rolling stock
Bombardier Transportation locomotives
High-speed trains of the United States
Passenger trains running at least at 200 km/h in commercial operations
Tilting trains
Train-related introductions in 2000
Electric multiple units with locomotive-like power cars
25 kV AC multiple units
Electric multiple units of the United States